Cigano (plural ciganos) is the Portuguese term for the Romani and may refer to:

 Romani people in Brazil
 Romani people in Portugal
Junior dos Santos, nicknamed Cigano, a Brazilian mixed martial arts fighter and former UFC heavyweight champion
Cigano (film), a 2013 film